A trigger warning  is a warning that a work contains writing, images, or concepts that may be distressing to some people.

Trigger warning or Trigger Warning may also refer to:

Books

Trigger Warning (book), a collection of short stories by Neil Gaiman

Film and television 

 Trigger Warning with Killer Mike, an American documentary series

Music 
 Trigger Warning (EP), a 2015 EP by Knife Party

See also
Trigger (disambiguation)
Triggered (disambiguation)
TW (disambiguation)